Devon League 3 was an English level eleven rugby union league for clubs based in Devon.  The champions were promoted to Devon League 2 and, as this was the lowest division in club rugby within Devon, there was no relegation.  The league was introduced ahead of the 1996–97 season and ran for seven seasons until it was cancelled at the end of the 2002–03 season, with all teams promoted into Devon League 2.

Original teams
When this division was introduced in 1996 it contained the following teams: 

Axminster - relegated from Devon 2 (9th)
Buckfastleigh Ramblers - new to league
Devonport HSOB - new to league
Marjon - new to league
Plymouth YMCA - relegated from Devon 2 (12th)
Plympton Victoria - relegated from Devon 2 (11th)
Wessex - new to league
Woodland Fort - new to league

Jesters were also relegated from Devon 2 and should have joined Devon 3.  However, they dropped out of the leagues and would become amalgamated with Old Plymothian & Mannamedian.

Devon League 3 honours

Devon 3 was a tier 11 league.  Promotion was to Devon 2 and there was no relegation.

Number of league titles

Prince Rock Woodland Fort (2)
Dartmouth (1)
Devonport HSOB (1)
Plymouth YMCA (1)
Salcombe (1)
Wessex (1)

Notes

See also
 South West Division RFU
 Devon RFU
 Devon 1
 Devon 2
 English rugby union system
 Rugby union in England

References

External links
 Devon RFU

D
Recurring sporting events established in 1996
Sports leagues established in 1996
Rugby union in Devon